Daniel Pedrosa Ramal (born 29 September 1985) is a Spanish Grand Prix motorcycle racer who retired from regular competition after the  season. He grew up in Castellar del Vallès, a village near Sabadell.  He is a three-time World Champion being the 125cc world champion in 2003, 250cc world champion in 2004, the youngest ever to win it and repeated it in 2005.

Pedrosa is a test and development rider for Red Bull KTM Factory Racing. In 2021, he returned to race for KTM as a wildcard rider in Austria at the Styrian Grand Prix. In addition to his testing duties with KTM, Pedrosa also competes in Lamborghini Super Trofeo Europe, driving for FFF Racing Team.

In 2019, the former Curva Dry Sac, a corner at the Spanish Circuito de Jerez, was renamed Curva Dani Pedrosa (English: Dani Pedrosa Corner) in his honour. He has been described as the best MotoGP rider to have never won a MotoGP World Championship.

Career

Early career
Born in Sabadell, Catalonia, Spain, Pedrosa started riding bikes at the early age of four, when he got his first motorcycle, an Italjet 50, which had side-wheels. His first racing bike was a minibike replica of a Kawasaki, which he got at the age of six and which he used to race with his friends. Pedrosa experienced real racing at the age of 9 when he entered the Spanish Minibike Championship and ended his debut season in second place, scoring his first podium finish in the second race of the season. The next year, Pedrosa entered the same championship, but health problems prevented him from improving his results, and he ended that season in 3rd position.

125cc World Championship
In 2001, Pedrosa made his World Championship debut in the 125cc class after being selected from the Movistar Activa Cup, a series designed to promote fresh racing talent in Spain, back in 1999. Under the guidance of Alberto Puig, Pedrosa scored two podium finishes in the first season and won his first race the following year, when he finished third in the championship. In 2003, he won five races and won the championship with two rounds remaining, scoring 223 points. In his first championship-winning year, Pedrosa scored five victories and six podium finishes. A week after winning the championship, eighteen-year-old Pedrosa broke both of his ankles in a crash during practice at Phillip Island, ending his season.

250cc World Championship
After winning the 125cc Championship, Pedrosa moved up to the 250cc class in 2004 without a proper test on the new bike because his ankles were healing during the off-season. Going into the season unprepared, Pedrosa won the first race in South Africa and went on to clinch the 250cc World Championship title, including rookie of the year honours. In his first season in the 250cc class, Pedrosa scored 7 victories and 13 podium finishes. Pedrosa decided to stay for one more season in the 250cc class, and he won another title, once again with two races remaining in the championship. In 2005, Pedrosa won 8 races and scored 14 podium finishes, despite a shoulder injury he sustained in a practice session for the Japanese Grand Prix.

MotoGP World Championship

2006
Critics said that Pedrosa's tiny stature was not strong enough to handle a big, heavy MotoGP bike and successfully race in the premier class. Proving critics wrong, he finished second in the opening round at Jerez on 26 March 2006. At his fourth ever MotoGP appearance, on 14 May 2006, during the Chinese Grand Prix, he won his first race. This win made him the equal 2nd youngest winner (tied with Norick Abe) in the premier class at the time, behind Freddie Spencer. He won his second MotoGP race at Donington Park and became a strong candidate for the MotoGP Championship. It was a memorable victory for Pedrosa, who shared the podium for the first time with Valentino Rossi in 2nd place. He also took two pole positions in the first half of the season. Until the Malaysian Grand Prix at Sepang, Pedrosa was 2nd in the Championship only behind his more experienced teammate Nicky Hayden. However, he fell heavily during free practice and suffered a severe gash to the knee, which practically rendered him immobile. Pedrosa qualified 5th on the grid in that race after heavy rain cancelled the qualifying session. He managed to finish 3rd in the race, behind Rossi and Ducati rider Loris Capirossi.

However, in the next races, his form dropped and he struggled with the bike, moving him down to 5th place in the MotoGP standings. His poor performance continued at Estoril. After a promising start, he briefly ran 2nd before being passed by Colin Edwards and then championship leader and teammate Hayden. On lap 5, he and Hayden were involved in a crash. Pedrosa made a mistake whilst trying to overtake Hayden, slid and crashed out of the race, taking out Hayden on the way. This crash ended his slim chances of winning the championship and also caused Hayden to lose his lead in the championship standings, as Rossi managed to finish 2nd. However, two weeks later, Hayden recovered to win the championship while Pedrosa managed to finish in 4th place. This result clinched his 5th place in overall standings in his debut season, thus taking the title as Rookie of the Year, beating former 250cc rival Casey Stoner. At the end of season three-day test of 2006 at Jerez, Pedrosa put his 800 cc RC212V at the top of the timesheets (on qualifying tyres) edging out Rossi, who had been fastest on the first two days, by 0.214 seconds.

2007

The machine had problems, and Pedrosa was taken out of races by Olivier Jacque and by Randy de Puniet, but he finished the season in second place behind Stoner and ahead of Rossi. He signed a 2-year contract with Repsol Honda for 2008 and 2009.

2008
In  Pedrosa's problems with the RC212V continued when he was injured in the pre-season and missed developmental testing, but started the season well by scoring a podium at the first round. While leading the race and the standings in the German round, he crashed and was injured, keeping him from racing in the following two rounds. Michelin's performance in MotoGP deteriorated, resulting in Pedrosa switching to Bridgestone at the Indianapolis round. He finished third in the standings in 2008.

2009
As in 2008, Pedrosa crashed in the  pre-season and injured himself, keeping him from testing the machine before the start of the season. He placed 11th in the first round, but recovered his fitness in the following rounds. At the fifth round he injured himself again in practice and then fell during the race, putting him 33 points behind the leader.

2010

For 2010, Pedrosa reverted to number 26—a number he used when he first entered MotoGP—from number 2 in 2008 and number 3 in 2009. He took this decision to please his fans who had asked him to return to the number he had always used. Pedrosa won four races in 2010 and finished second in the championship standings behind Jorge Lorenzo.

2011

Pedrosa took podium placings in the opening three races of the season, culminating in a victory at the Portuguese Grand Prix in May. On lap 18 of the following race in France, Pedrosa was involved in an incident with Gresini Racing's Marco Simoncelli while fighting over second place in the race; Simoncelli passed Pedrosa on the outside line into the Chemin aux Boeufs, but pulled in front of Pedrosa and as a result, Pedrosa clipped Simoncelli's rear wheel and fell to the ground. Simoncelli was given a ride-through penalty, while the fall left Pedrosa with a broken collarbone, which ruled him out until July's Italian Grand Prix, where he finished in eighth place.

Pedrosa claimed his second victory of the season at the German Grand Prix, after taking advantage of an error by Lorenzo with nine laps left in the race. He finished third at Laguna Seca the following weekend, before taking his first pole position of the season at the Czech Grand Prix. He crashed out during the race, but finished the next three races in second place, before winning his third race of the season – and the 400th race win by a Spanish rider – in Japan, where his title chances in 2010 had ended; and moved within one point of teammate Dovizioso for third place in the championship. Dovizioso finished ahead of Pedrosa in both Australia and Valencia, while the Malaysian race, in which Pedrosa had qualified on pole for, was cancelled due to the death of Simoncelli in the first attempt to run the race.

2012
Pedrosa remained with Repsol Honda into the  season, again partnering Stoner in a reduced two-bike effort. Pedrosa finished six of the first seven races on the podium, with a best result of second on three occasions. He won his first race of the season at the German Grand Prix, winning at the Sachsenring for the third year in succession; Pedrosa and Stoner had been running one-two in the race, before Stoner crashed on the final lap. At the Italian Grand Prix, it was announced that Pedrosa had signed a two-year contract extension with the Repsol Honda team from  onwards, and would be partnered by Moto2 front-runner Marc Márquez. Pedrosa finished that weekend's race second, before a third place at the United States Grand Prix. Following the summer break, Pedrosa scored his second victory of the season at Indianapolis, winning from pole position as well as setting a lap record during the race. He followed that victory up with another at Brno, prevailing after a final-lap battle with main title rival Jorge Lorenzo.

At Misano, Pedrosa qualified on pole for the race, which was then delayed after Karel Abraham's Ducati stalled just before the start, forcing the riders to complete a second parade lap. Pedrosa's front tyre warmer became stuck just before his bike was restarted; the bike was removed from the grid – to be replaced by the back-up bike – but the tyre warmer was removed at the last moment and the bike was restored to the grid. However, Pedrosa had to start the race from the back, due to a rules infraction relating to the start procedure. He had managed to make his way into the top ten on the opening lap before he was taken out by Héctor Barberá, losing ground to Lorenzo, who won the race. In the Aragon Grand Prix, Pedrosa qualified second but took the victory, after passing Lorenzo on lap seven; the result allowed Pedrosa to close the championship gap to 33 points. In the end, Pedrosa failed to become champion after his DNF in Australia. He finished the 2012 season as runner-up to Lorenzo with 332 points, the highest number of points ever gained without taking the title at the time.

2013
Pedrosa remained with Repsol Honda into the  season partnering new teammate Marc Márquez. He won races in Spain, France, and Malaysia but missed the race in Germany, due to injury. He also failed to finish in Aragon after contact with Márquez. He obtained 300 points for the season, and finished in third place in the championship, behind Jorge Lorenzo and Márquez, who won the championship.

2014

Pedrosa remained with Repsol Honda into the  season, again partnering Márquez and started the season positively, by recording four consecutive podium finishes. His first victory of the season came in the Czech Republic, ending the 10-race winning streak that Márquez had been on, since the start of the season. He was involved in a three-way rivalry with Yamaha riders Lorenzo and Rossi to finish as the overall championship runner-up, but had to settle for fourth place after failing to score any points in the races at Phillip Island and Sepang.

2015
Pedrosa remained with Repsol Honda into the  season, and took a sixth-place finish in the opening race in Qatar. Thereafter, he missed the races in Texas, Argentina and Spain, after electing to undergo surgery to alleviate issues with arm-pump. Pedrosa returned to racing at Le Mans but he crashed at the Dunlop chicane; he remounted and could only finish in sixteenth place, before he finished in fourth place at Mugello. Pedrosa claimed his first podium of the season at the Catalan Grand Prix, finishing third behind the Yamahas of Jorge Lorenzo and Valentino Rossi, before he finished in eighth place at Assen.

Pedrosa finished second behind teammate Márquez in Germany. Pedrosa achieved his first victory of the season – the fiftieth of his career, becoming the eighth rider to reach that mark – in drying conditions at Motegi. The victory ensured that Pedrosa completed a fourteenth successive season with at least one win. He added a second win in Malaysia. Pedrosa finished fourth in the championship standings.

2016
Pedrosa remained with Repsol Honda for the  season. Despite a difficult season, struggling with the Michelin tires and with an RC213V that he found difficult to ride, he was able to score in every race he finished and to maintain his streak of winning at least one race in each of the eleven seasons (2006-2016) that he has competed in the premier class.

Pedrosa began the season with a fifth-place finish in Qatar, and placed in the top five in each of the first seven rounds apart from Texas (where a crash with Ducati's Andrea Dovizioso took both riders out of the race), with third place podium finishes in Argentina and Catalunya. Pedrosa struggled with setup and the Michelin tires through the next several cold and rain-hit rounds. He returned to the top five in Great Britain and achieved his first and only win of the season with a strong performance at Misano. A highside crash in free practice 2 at Motegi essentially ended Pedrosa's season, with a fractured right collarbone, right fibula, and left foot causing him to miss the three flyaway races while undergoing and recovering from the 14th major surgery of his career. He returned for the final race of the season but crashed out of the race. Pedrosa finished sixth in the championship standings, his worst finish to a season since his rookie year in the premier class.

2017 
Pedrosa was contracted to continue racing for Repsol Honda for 2017 and 2018. In 2017, Pedrosa achieved two wins (Spain & Valencia) and a further seven podium finishes to ultimately finish the championship in fourth position with 210 points.

2018
Pedrosa completed a difficult season in 2018, achieving no wins and no podiums for the first time in his MotoGP career. He finished the season in 11th position of the riders' championship, his worst-ever result and only second time outside of the top five. Following the fact that Honda didn't renew his contract for the 2019 season, with Jorge Lorenzo taking his place, Pedrosa announced in a press conference at the German Grand Prix on 12 July that he would retire from the MotoGP world championship by the end of 2018.

Post-motorcycle racing career 
In late October 2018, it was confirmed Pedrosa signed for the KTM Factory Racing team as a development test rider for 2019 and 2020, shocklingly ending his long association with Honda. He initially dismissed notions of making wildcard entries to races with KTM, as is often typical for development riders, and even refused to replace Johann Zarco for the remainder of the 2019 season after the Frenchman's sudden decision to end his contract at KTM. Pedrosa later softened this stance in early 2020, saying "he would now consider a return to MotoGP as a wildcard entrant, should KTM require him to test the RC16 in race conditions." Due to the COVID-19 pandemic response, wildcard entries were later forbidden for the 2020 season, in order to minimize paddock personnel. After the restriction was lifted, Pedrosa made his return to the MotoGP grid as a wildcard entry at the 2021 Styrian motorcycle Grand Prix, finishing in tenth place.

Sportscar racing
In March 2022, Pedrosa was announced to be competing in three rounds of the 2022 Lamborghini Super Trofeo Europe with the Rexal FFF Racing Team, driving the #29 Lamborghini Huracán in what would be his first foray into automobile racing. Swiss endurance racing driver Antonin Borga was also announced as his co-driver; he would compete in the Pro-Am class of the championship.

Pedrosa and Borga qualified 5th in the first race at Imola and finished 9th in his class and 19th overall; in the second race, he qualified 21st but finished 4th in his class and 8th overall. Pedrosa and Borga would fail to finish the next two races, both due to collisions.

Injuries
Throughout his World Championship career Pedrosa has been plagued by injuries, and has a high injury per crash ratio compared to other top riders. These injuries has often prevented him from clean seasons that would allow a shot at the title.

 2003 Australian motorcycle Grand Prix (125cc) Double fracture in the talus bone of the left foot and a fracture of the right ankle.
 2005 Japanese motorcycle Grand Prix (250cc) Fracture of the left humeral head that affected the supraspinal tendon.
 2006 Malaysian motorcycle Grand Prix (MotoGP) Small fracture of the small left toe and loss of cutaneous matter on the right knee. 5 stitches in that vertical cut.
 2007 Turkish motorcycle Grand Prix (MotoGP)  Thoracic trauma, blow to the left gluteus and neck trauma.
 2007 Japanese motorcycle Grand Prix (MotoGP) Post-traumatic arthritis with inflammation to the small toe of the left foot.
 2008 Sepang test (MotoGP) Fracture of the second metacarpal in the right hand, with three diaphyseal fragments, which are the bones that are found in the middle part of the metacarpus.
 2008 German motorcycle Grand Prix (MotoGP) General inflammation of the left hand with hematomas in the veins of the extensor tendons. Displaced fracture of the distal phalanx of the left index finger. A sprain of the interphalangeal articulation next to the left middle finger. Fracture of the large bone of the left wrist. Sprain of the lateral external ligament of the right ankle.
 2008 Australian motorcycle Grand Prix (MotoGP) Capsular hematoma on the left knee that had to be treated two months after.
 2009 Qatar test (MotoGP) Fracture of the radius of the left arm and contusion on the left knee that required a skin graft, because the scar re-opened from an operation before Christmas.
 2009 Italian motorcycle Grand Prix (MotoGP) Incomplete fracture of the greater trochanter of the right femur. A fracture without displacement, an injury that requires absolute rest and treatment with painkillers.
 2009 December (MotoGP) Underwent an operation to remove a screw from his left wrist.
 2010 Japanese motorcycle Grand Prix (MotoGP) Four-fragment chip fracture of the left collarbone and a Grade 1 ankle sprain.
 2011 French motorcycle Grand Prix (MotoGP) Fractured right collarbone.
 2013 German motorcycle Grand Prix (MotoGP) Small fracture of left collarbone.
 2015 Qatar motorcycle Grand Prix (MotoGP) Arm pump of right hand.
 2016 Japanese motorcycle Grand Prix (MotoGP) Fracture of right collarbone consisting of four fragments, requiring surgery (the 14th major surgery of his career ). Subcapital fracture of the right fibula with no displacement, requiring only immobilization. Fracture to the fourth metatarsal of the left foot.
 2018 Argentine motorcycle Grand Prix (MotoGP) Fracture of the right wrist, requiring surgery to repair.
 2019 January (Test rider) Right collarbone fracture due to weakness from previous breaks.

Career statistics

Grand Prix motorcycle racing

By season

By class

Races by year
(key) (Races in bold indicate pole position; races in italics indicate fastest lap)

Complete Lamborghini Super Trofeo Europe results

References

External links

 

Spanish motorcycle racers
Motorcycle racers from Catalonia
Repsol Honda MotoGP riders
Sportspeople from Sabadell
250cc World Championship riders
125cc World Championship riders
1985 births
Living people
MotoGP World Championship riders
KTM Factory Racing MotoGP riders
250cc World Riders' Champions
125cc World Riders' Champions
Spanish racing drivers
Lamborghini Super Trofeo drivers